António Weck (born 11 November 1932, died before 2008) was a Portuguese sailor. He competed in the Dragon event at the 1968 Summer Olympics.

References

External links
 

1932 births
Year of death missing
Portuguese male sailors (sport)
Olympic sailors of Portugal
Sailors at the 1968 Summer Olympics – Dragon
Sportspeople from Lisbon